Horse Branch is a  long 1st order tributary to the Trent River in Lenoir County, North Carolina.

Course
Horse Branch rises about 2 miles north of Nobles Mill, North Carolina and then takes a southerly course to join the Trent River about 0.5 miles east of Nobles Mill.

Watershed
Horse Branch drains  of area, receives about 51.3 in/year of precipitation, has a wetness index of 575.21, and is about 32% forested.

References

Rivers of North Carolina
Rivers of Lenoir County, North Carolina